Penglai is a legendary land of Chinese mythology. It is known in Japanese mythology as Hōrai.

Location
According to the Classic of Mountains and Seas, the mountain is located at the eastern end of Bohai Sea. According to the pre-Qin mythology which retells the legend of Xu Fu presenting a memorial to the Qin Emperor in order to seek for the elixir of life, there are three godly mountains which are found in the Bohai sea where immortals reside; these mountains are Penglai, Fāngzhàng, and Yíngzhōu (/). Other islands where immortals reside are called Dàiyú and Yuánjiāo.

In the Illustrated Account of the Embassy to Goryeo in the Xuanhe Era (Xuanhe fengshi Gaoli tujing), written in 1124 by Xu Jing (徐兢), Mount Penglai is located on an inhabited island which is found within the boundaries of Changguo prefecture and can be reached "after crossing thirty thousand leagues of the Weak Water".

Various theories have been offered over the years as to the "real" location of these places, including Japan, Nam-Hae, Geo-Je, Jejudo south of the Korean Peninsula, and Taiwan. Penglai, Shandong exists, but its claimed connection is as the site of departures for those leaving for the island rather than the island itself. In his work  (lit. "A Guide to Select Villages"), Yi Chung-hwan, a Joseon-period geographer, associated Mount Penglai with Korea's Mount Kumgang.

In Chinese mythology
In a legend originating in the state of Qi during the pre-Qin period, immortals live in a palace called the Penglai Palace which is located on Mount Penglai. In Chinese mythology the mountain is often said to be the base for the Eight Immortals (or at least where they travel to have a ceremonial meal), as well as the illusionist Anqi Sheng. Supposedly, everything on the mountain appears pure white, while its palaces are made from gold and silver, and jewels grow on trees. There is no agony and no winter; there are rice bowls and wine glasses that never become empty no matter how much people eat or drink from them; and there are enchanted fruits growing in Penglai that can heal any ailment, grant eternal youth, and even resurrect the dead.

Historically, Qin Shi Huang, in search of the elixir of life, made several efforts to find the landmass where the mountain is located, to no benefit. Legends tell that Xu Fu, one servant sent to find the island, found Japan instead, and named Mount Fuji as Penglai.

In Japanese mythology
From the medieval periods onwards, Mount Penglai was believed by some Japanese people to be located in Japan where Xu Fu and Yang Guifei arrived and eventually decided to stay there for the rest of their lives.

The presentation of Mt. Hōrai in Lafcadio Hearn's Kwaidan: Stories and Studies of Strange Things differs from the earlier Chinese legend. This version rejects much of the fantastic and magical properties of Hōrai. In this version of the myth, Hōrai is not free from sorrow or death, and the winters are bitterly cold. Hearn's conception of Hōrai holds that there are no magical fruits that cure disease, grant eternal youth or raise the dead, and no rice bowls or wine glasses that never become empty; rather, Hearn's incarnation of the myth of Hōrai focuses more on the atmosphere of the place, which is said to be made up not of air but of "quintillions of quintillions" of souls. Breathing in these souls is said to grant one all of the perceptions and knowledge of these ancient souls. The Japanese version also holds that the people of Hōrai are small fairies who they have no knowledge of great evil, and therefore their hearts never grow old.

In the Kwaidan there is some indication that the Japanese hold such a place to be merely a fantasy. It is pointed out that "Hōrai is also called Shinkiro, which signifies Mirage—the Vision of the Intangible".

See also
Avalon
Dilmun, paradise-island in the Epic of Gilgamesh
Luggnagg, the island of the immortal struldbrugs in Jonathan Swift's Gulliver's Travels
Tír na nÓg
Shangri-La

References

Locations in Chinese mythology
Penglai
Penglai
Locations in Japanese mythology
Mythical utopias
Asia in mythology